Marilyn Jorgenson Reece (September 8, 1926 – May 15, 2004) was an American civil engineer, and the first woman to be licensed as a civil engineer by the state of California. She designed an innovative interchange in the 1960s that handled fast moving traffic in Los Angeles. The interchange is now named after her.

Early life 
Marilyn Jorgensen was born on September 8, 1926 in Kenmare, North Dakota, to Virgil and Marion Jorgenson. She was born of Danish decent.

Education 
She attended Shakopee High School in Minnesota, graduating in the class of 1944 as the salutatorian.

She received a degree in civil engineering from the University of Minnesota in 1948. Following graduation, she moved to California, and began working for the State Division of Highways. In 1954 she became the first woman to be a registered civil engineer in the state of California.

Career 
Among the many many projects that she supervised, her most celebrated work is the iconic interchange between the 10 and the 405 freeways in Los Angeles, California. This interchange was designed to accommodate traffic moving at high speeds, and represented the forefront of traffic engineering in its day, opening in 1964. For this work she was awarded the Governor's Design Excellence Award from Pat Brown, and in 2008, this interchange was named in her honor.

Personal life 
She was married to Alvin Reece who also worked as a civil engineer for Caltrans. They had two daughters, Kirsten Reece Stahl (who became a civil engineer) and Anne Reece Bartolotti.

She died on May 15, 2004 in Hacienda Heights, California, and was survived by her husband and their two daughters.

References 

1926 births
2004 deaths
20th-century American engineers
Transport engineers
People from North Dakota